John Phillip Rilley or Riley (January 22, 1877 – November 16, 1950) was a landsman serving in the United States Navy during the Spanish–American War who received the Medal of Honor for bravery.

Biography
Riley was born January 22, 1877, in Allentown, Pennsylvania and after entering the navy was sent to fight in the Spanish–American War aboard the U.S.S. Nashville as a landsman.

He died on November 16, 1950, and is buried in Greenlawn Cemetery in Salem, Massachusetts.

Medal of Honor citation
Rank and organization: Landsman, U.S. Navy. Born: 22 January 1877, Allentown, Pa. Accredited to: Massachusetts. G.O. No.: 521, July 1899.

Citation:

On board the U.S.S. Nashville during the operation of cutting the cable leading from Cienfuegos, Cuba, 11 May 1898. Facing the heavy fire of the enemy, Riley displayed extraordinary bravery and coolness throughout this action.

See also

 List of Medal of Honor recipients for the Spanish–American War

References

External links
 

1877 births
1950 deaths
United States Navy Medal of Honor recipients
United States Navy sailors
American military personnel of the Spanish–American War
Military personnel from Allentown, Pennsylvania
Spanish–American War recipients of the Medal of Honor